The 1st Central American and Caribbean Junior Championships was held in Maracaibo, Venezuela on 12–15 December 1974, one and a half year after having already hosted the 4th CAC senior championships in July 1973.

Event summary
The athletes from Mexico gained most of the gold medals.  In the total medal count, Venezuela equalizes the Mexican result, both countries gaining 21 each.

In the under-20 men category, Anthony Husbands, Trinidad and Tobago, won two gold (100m, 200m) and one silver medal (4 × 100 m relay), double gold was won by José Briano from Mexico (3000m, 5000m), and Carmelo Martínez from Cuba (Long jump, Triple jump).

In the under-20 women category, Dorothy Scott, Jamaica, won three golds (100m, Long jump, 4 × 100 m relay), and Maureen Gottschalk, Jamaica, gained two golds (200m, 4 × 400 m relay) and one bronze medal (400m).

The event saw an early appearance of Ernesto Canto, Mexico, won the gold medal in the men's 20 kilometre walk event at the 1984 Summer Olympics held in Los Angeles, United States.  He was successful in the 10,000 metres track walk competition.  Moreover, Luis Delís from Cuba won the Discus competition.  He was going to win the bronze medal at the 1980 Summer Olympics in Moscow, Soviet Union, as well as silver at the 1983 World Championships in Helsinki, Finland, and bronze at the 1987 World Championships in Rome, Italy.

Medal summary
Medal winners are published by category: Junior A, Male, and Junior A, Female.

Male Junior A (under 20)

Female Junior A (under 20)

Medal table (unofficial)

Participation (unofficial)

Detailed result lists can be found on the World Junior Athletics History website.
An unofficial count yields the number of about 196 athletes from about 10 countries:

 (1)
 (10)
 (3)
 (13)
 (4)
 (21)
 (30)
 (41)
 (30)
 (43)

References

External links
Official CACAC Website
World Junior Athletics History

Central American and Caribbean Junior Championships in Athletics
1974 in Venezuelan sport
Central American and Caribbean Junior Championships
International athletics competitions hosted by Venezuela
1974 in youth sport